Signes is a commune in the Var department in the Provence-Alpes-Côte d'Azur region in southeastern France.

Industrialist Paul Ricard was mayor of Signes from 1972 to 1980. Jean-Mathieu Michel became mayor in 1983, and served until he was run over in August 2019 after confronting a driver whom he accused of illegally dumping rubble.

See also
Communes of the Var department

References

Communes of Var (department)